Hoppet is an urban area on the island of Muskö and in Haninge Municipality, Stockholm County, Sweden.

References 

Populated places in Haninge Municipality